Justin Gilberto Geduld (born 1 October 1993) is a South African rugby union player, currently contracted to SARU as a sevens rugby player, as well as playing domestic rugby union for . His regular position is centre.

He was a member of the South Africa Sevens team that won a bronze medal at the 2016 Summer Olympics.

Youth rugby
Geduld represented  at the 2011 Craven Week competition and also played for their Under-19 team in the 2012 Under-19 Provincial Championship competition.
Geduld was included in the S.A. Under-20 squad for the 2013 IRB Junior World Championship.

National sevens team
In 2013, Geduld was contracted to play rugby sevens for the South Africa Sevens team. He represented the team in the 2012–13 IRB Sevens World Series and played in tournaments in New Zealand, Hong Kong, Japan and Scotland.

Geduld was included in a 12-man squad for the 2016 Summer Olympics in Rio de Janeiro. He was named in the starting lineup for their first match in Group B of the competition against Spain, with South Africa winning the match 24–0.

References

External links
 
 
 
 

South African rugby union players
Living people
1993 births
Sportspeople from Cape Town
South Africa international rugby sevens players
South Africa Under-20 international rugby union players
Rugby sevens players at the 2014 Commonwealth Games
Rugby sevens players at the 2018 Commonwealth Games
Commonwealth Games gold medallists for South Africa
Commonwealth Games rugby sevens players of South Africa
Rugby sevens players at the 2016 Summer Olympics
Olympic rugby sevens players of South Africa
Olympic bronze medalists for South Africa
Olympic medalists in rugby sevens
Medalists at the 2016 Summer Olympics
Commonwealth Games medallists in rugby sevens
Western Province (rugby union) players
Rugby sevens players at the 2020 Summer Olympics
Medallists at the 2014 Commonwealth Games